Samuel Kemper (died 1814) was an American adventurer and filibuster.

Filibustering activities
Born in Fauquier County, Virginia, Kemper was involved, along with his brothers Reuben and Nathan Kemper, in the 1804 rebellion against Spanish authorities in West Florida.

Kemper participated in the 1812-13 Gutiérrez-Magee Expedition into Spanish Texas.  He became commander of the force upon the death of Colonel Magee during the siege of La Bahia in February 1813.  Kemper fought in both the victorious Battle of Rosillo Creek and the disastrous Battle of Medina.  He eventually withdrew from the expedition when he lost confidence in the rebellious Mexican leaders.

Death
Kemper fell ill from malaria on his return to the United States and died at St. Francisville, Louisiana, in 1814.

References
Andrew McMichael, Atlantic Loyalties: Americans in Spanish West Florida, 1785-1810, University of Georgia Press, 2008.

External links
 

18th-century births
1814 deaths
People from Fauquier County, Virginia
American filibusters (military)
Year of birth unknown
Deaths from malaria